Aletes has been regarded a genus of flowering plants in the family Apiaceae, all of which are endemic to North America. , Plants of the World Online regarded Aletes as a synonym of Cymopterus, while GRIN Taxonomy regarded it as a possible synonym of that genus.

Species that may be placed in the genus include the following (placements in Cymopterus from Plants of the World Online):
Aletes acaulis (Torr.) J.M.Coult. & Rose - stemless Indian parsley → Cymopterus hallii
Aletes filifolius Mathias, Constance & W.L.Theobald - Trans-Pecos Indian parsley → Cymopterus filifoliusAletes humilis J.M.Coult. & Rose - Colorado aletesAletes macdougalii J.M.Coult. & Rose - MacDougal's Indian parsley → Cymopterus macdougaliiAletes sessiliflorus W.L.Theobald & C.C.Tseng - sessileflower Indian parsley → Cymopterus sessiliflorus''

References 

Flora of North America
Taxa named by John Merle Coulter
Apioideae
Apioideae genera